Hide Your Heart may refer to:

 Hide Your Heart (album), a 1988 album by Bonnie Tyler
 "Hide Your Heart" (song), a titular song by Bonnie Tyler from the above album
 Hide Your Heart Tour, a 1988 concert tour by Bonnie Tyler